Griderville is a rural unincorporated community in northern Barren County, Kentucky, United States.

History

Geography 
The community is located in the north-central portion of Barren County, at the junction of U.S. Route 31E and Kentucky Route 70. US 31E leads south to Glasgow, and north to Hardyville and Hodgenville.

Post office
Griderville is currently served by the Cave City post office by default with ZIP code 42127.

References

Unincorporated communities in Barren County, Kentucky
Unincorporated communities in Kentucky